Thelcticopis severa is a species of huntsman spider found in China, Laos, Korea, and Japan. It is the type species for the genus Thelcticopis, and was first described by Charles Athanase Walckenaer in 1875.

References

Sparassidae
Arthropods of Laos
Spiders of Asia
Spiders described in 1875